Quinton Ferrell (born September 29, 1985) is an American college basketball coach and the current head men's basketball coach at Presbyterian College.

Playing career
Farrell played basketball for Presbyterian from 2003–2007. A team captain his senior year, he led the Blue Hose in assists and steals in his final two seasons. He was twice named the teams Most Valuable Defensive Player.

Coaching career
After he graduated, he joined his alma mater as an assistant coach for five seasons. His first season, he helped transition Presbyterian from NCAA Division II status into NCAA Division I. He recruited two of the top scorers in school history, bringing in Khalid Mutakabbir and Al’Lonzo Coleman, who both earned All-Big South Conference two times in their careers. He joined The Citadel as an assistant coach in 2012, while his main focus working with the perimeter players. 

He then spent one season at Army as an assistant, working closely with the guards, before he joined the College of Charleston in 2014. He would spend five seasons at CoC, helping to guide the Cougars to three consecutive 20-win seasons, and an NCAA Tournament berth.

He was announced as the 19th head coach in school history at Presbyterian on April 11, 2019, after former head coach Dustin Kerns took the vacant head coaching position at Appalachian State.

Head coaching record

References

1985 births
Living people
American men's basketball coaches
American men's basketball players
Army Black Knights men's basketball coaches
Basketball coaches from South Carolina
Basketball players from South Carolina
The Citadel Bulldogs basketball coaches
College of Charleston Cougars men's basketball coaches
People from North Augusta, South Carolina
Presbyterian Blue Hose men's basketball coaches
Presbyterian Blue Hose men's basketball players